Chief Pleas or Court of Chief Pleas may refer to:
 Chief Pleas (Sark), legislative assembly of Sark, Channel Islands
 Court of Chief Pleas (Guernsey), ancient court which meets annually in Guernsey, Channel Islands
 Court of Chief Place, former court in Ireland, occasionally called "Court of Chief Pleas"

See also
 Exchequer of Pleas or Court of Exchequer
 Court of Common Pleas, type of court in various common-law jurisdictions